Dawn Prestwich is an American television writer and producer. She attended The Hockaday School in Dallas, Texas and Stanford University. In 1997, she shared an Emmy nomination with several producers of Chicago Hope in the category "Outstanding Drama Series". In 2003, she and Nicole Yorkin won a Writers Guild of America award for the pilot episode of the episodic drama The Education of Max Bickford.

In 2009 Prestwich and Yorkin joined the crew of new ABC science fiction drama FlashForward as consulting producers and writers. The series was co-created by David S. Goyer and Brannon Braga. The show follows a team of FBI agents investigating a global blackout that gave victims a vision of their future. Prestwich and Yorkin co-wrote the teleplay for the episode "Gimme Some Truth" based on a story by Barbara Nance. They also co-wrote the episodes "Believe" and "Goodbye Yellow Brick Road".

She co-created the period drama Z: The Beginning of Everything for Amazon with Nicole Yorkin in 2015.

In 2019 she co-created the Netflix international action drama Hit & Run with Nicole Yorkin, Lior Raz and Avi Issacharoff
She lives in Los Angeles, California and has two sons, Noah and Isaac.

Spouse: John Wescott (M. 2022)

Credits (selected)
 Melrose Place (1993) - writer
 Picket Fences (1994) - writer - producer
 Chicago Hope (1995–1999) - writer, co-executive producer
 Judging Amy (1999–2001) - writer and co-executive producer
 The Education of Max Bickford (2001–2002) - writer/creator - executive producer
 Carnivàle (2003–2005) - writer and co-executive producer
 Battlestar Galactica (2005) - writer
 Brotherhood (2006) - writer and co-executive producer
 The Riches (2007–2008) - writer and executive producer
 FlashForward (2009–2010) - writer and consulting producer
 The Killing (2011–2014)  - writer and executive producer
 Z: The Beginning of Everything (2015–2017) - creator, writer and co-executive producer
 Hit & Run (2021) - creator, writer and co-executive producer

References

External links
 

American television producers
American women television producers
American television writers
Living people
American women television writers
Writers Guild of America Award winners
Place of birth missing (living people)
Year of birth missing (living people)
Hockaday School alumni
21st-century American women